In Motion is the second full-length album by the Lakeland, Florida-based band Copeland. It was released in 2005. The album includes a bonus disc of the Sony Connect Sessions with acoustic versions of "Don't Slow Down," "Pin Your Wings," "Take Care," and "Coffee," the latter two of which are taken from Beneath Medicine Tree.

The album peaked at #115 on the Billboard 200.

Critical reception
AllMusic wrote that In Motion "is a surprisingly varied album, offering everything from the muscular emo attack of 'No One Really Wins' to the waltz-time accordion-and-falsetto strangeness of 'Kite.'" Seattle Weekly wrote that the album is characterized by an "emo-tinged whine." Paste called the album "disarmingly anthemic power pop filtered through some unexpectedly theatrical Southeastern sun."

Track listing

 "No One Really Wins" (A. Marsh) – 3:26
 "Choose the One Who Loves You More" (A. Marsh, S. Nichols, B. Laurenson) – 5:01
 "Pin Your Wings" (A. Marsh) – 3:11
 "Sleep" (A. Marsh, B. Laurenson) – 4:52
 "Kite" (A. Marsh) – 4:04
 "Don't Slow Down" (A. Marsh, B. Laurenson) – 4:13
 "Love Is a Fast Song" (A. Marsh, B. Laurenson) – 4:45
 "You Have My Attention" (A. Marsh, B. Laurenson) – 4:02
 "You Love to Sing" (A. Marsh, B. Laurenson) – 4:54
 "Hold Nothing Back" (A. Marsh) – 2:56

All music written and arranged by Copeland except "Choose the One Who Loves You More," written by Copeland and Stephen Nichols.

Personnel

Aaron Marsh - vocals, guitars, keyboards, production
Bryan Laurenson - guitars, keyboards
James Likeness - bass guitars, layout and design, photography
Jonathan Bucklew - drums, percussion
Matt Goldman - production, engineering, additional percussion
Troy Stains - additional engineering, additional guitars on "No One Really Wins", "Kite" and "Don't Slow Down", lap steel guitar on "You Love to Sing"
Ken Andrews - mixing
Mike Fossenkemper - mastering
Stephen Nichols - additional vocals on "Choose the One Who Loves You More"
Chris Arias - accordion on "Kite"

References

External links
 

Copeland (band) albums
2005 albums
The Militia Group albums
Albums produced by Matt Goldman
Albums produced by Aaron Marsh